Puteri Indonesia 2011, the 16th Annual Puteri Indonesia beauty pageant, was held in Jakarta Convention Center, Jakarta, Indonesia on 7 October 2011. Thirty eight contestants from all 33 provinces of Indonesia competed for the title of Puteri Indonesia, one of the most prominent beauty pageant titles in the country.

Nadine Alexandra Dewi Ames, Puteri Indonesia 2010 from Jakarta Special Capital Region 4 crowned Maria Selena of Central Java at the end of this event at Plenary Hall, Jakarta Convention Center, Jakarta. Maria Selena of Central Java is going to represent Indonesia at the Miss Universe 2012, while Liza Elly Purnamasari of East Java and Andi Tenri Gusti Hanum Utari Natassa of South Sulawesi will represent the nation at the Miss International 2012 and the Miss Asia Pacific World 2012 respectively. The event was broadcast live on Indonesian television network, Indosiar. Miss Universe 2011, Leila Lopes, present during the event.

Result 

The Crowns of Puteri Indonesia Title Holders
 Puteri Indonesia 2011 (Miss Universe Indonesia 2011) 
  Puteri Indonesia Lingkungan 2011 (Miss International Indonesia 2011)
 Puteri Indonesia Pariwisata 2011 (Miss Asia Pacific Indonesia 2011)

Contestants

Replacements
 South Sumatera was supposed to be represented by Apriliza Ralasati, but her runner-up, Atika Zulia, took the title because she didn't get dispensation from her university.

See also
Miss Indonesia 2011

References

2011
2011 in Indonesia
2011 beauty pageants